Belgrade, the capital city of Serbia, is divided into seventeen municipalities, of which ten are urban and seven suburban. In this list, each neighbourhood or suburb is categorised by the municipality in which it is situated. Six of these ten urban municipalities are completely within the bounds of Belgrade City Proper, while the remaining four have both urban and suburban parts. The seven suburban municipalities, on the other hand, are completely located within suburban bounds.

Municipalities of the City of Belgrade are officially divided into local communities (Serbian: месна заједница / mesna zajednica). These are arbitrary administrative units which on occasion correspond to the neighbourhoods and suburbs located in a municipality, though usually they don't. Their boundaries often change as the communities merge with each other, split from one another, or change names,  so the historical and traditional names of the neighbourhoods survive.

In the majority of cases, especially in the old urban areas of Belgrade, the neighbourhoods and suburbs don't have firm geographical or administrative boundaries. This sometimes causes confusion even among Belgraders, as many have different views on where one neighbourhood or suburb ends and another begins. Cases of this kind of contention include:

 Boundaries shaped through history, in many cases overlapping (Palilula–Hadžipopovac–Profesorska Kolonija).
 Sub-neighbourhoods or parts of a larger neighbourhood (Čukarica–Banovo Brdo–Čukarička Padina).
 Different names for the same areas (Englezovac–Savinac–Vračar).
 Neighbourhoods of the same name stretching outside their own municipalities (sometimes even with the same name: extreme west of the neighbourhood of Palilula (Jevremovac) belongs to the municipality of Stari Grad, not the municipality of Palilula).
 Some are completely located in another municipality (Selo Rakovica is located in the municipality of Voždovac, not in the municipality of Rakovica).
 Inhabitants of one neighbourhood, even though geographically belonging to one area, consider themselves inhabitants of another (Bežanija–Bežanijski Blokovi).

Barajevo 

Suburban:

Čukarica 

Urban:

Suburban:

Grocka 

Suburban:

Neighbourhoods of Kaluđerica:

Neighbourhoods of Vrčin:

Lazarevac 

Suburban:

Mladenovac 

Suburban:

Novi Beograd 

Urban:

Obrenovac

Suburban:

Palilula 

Urban:

Suburban:

Neighbourhoods of Borča:

Neighbourhoods of Padinska Skela:

Rakovica 

Urban:

Savski Venac 

Urban:

Sopot 

Suburban:

Stari Grad 

Urban:

Surčin 

Suburban:

Voždovac 

Urban:

 Suburban:

Neighbourhoods of Ripanj:

Vračar 

Urban:

Zemun 

Urban:

Suburban:

Zvezdara

Urban:

See also
Subdivisions of Belgrade
Populated places of Serbia

Serbia geography-related lists

Lists of neighbourhoods
Neighbourhoods